Queens Gate is a census-designated place (CDP) in York County, Pennsylvania, United States. The population was 1,464 at the 2010 census. The area was part of the Tyler Run-Queens Gate CDP at the 2000 census.

Geography
Queens Gate is located at  (39.9406, -76.6874) in York Township, just south of the city of York.

Demographics

References

Census-designated places in York County, Pennsylvania
Census-designated places in Pennsylvania